El Señor de la Querencia (English: The Lord of the Farm) is a nighttime soap opera broadcast by Televisión Nacional de Chile. El Señor de la Querencia is set in a rural estate in Colina, Chile in 1920. It differs from former Chilean series by the large amounts of domestic violence, sexual abuses, extortions, threats, torture and violence shown as part of the plot. Chilean minister Laura Albornoz expressed her concern about the impact of the repeatedly shown domestic violence and sexual abuses shown in the soap opera.

Starring by Julio Milostich as the main villain, as co-protagonist Sigrid Alegría and Álvaro Rudolphy.

Cast
 Julio Milostich – José Luis Echeñique
 Sigrid Alegría – Leonor Amenábar 
 Álvaro Rudolphy – Manuel Pradenas
 Alejandra Fosalba – Mercedes de los Ríos
 Matías Oviedo – Ignacio Echeñique 
 Patricia López – María Pradenas 
 Álvaro Espinoza – Buenaventura Moreno 
 Bárbara Ruiz-Tagle – Leontina Aguirre 
 Celine Reymond – Teresa Echeñique 
 Andrés Reyes – Luis Emilio Echeñique
 Antonia Santa María – Violeta Moreno
 Begoña Basauri – Herminia Pradenas
 Lorena Bosch – Lucrecia Santa María
 Nicolás Poblete – Juan Cristóba León 
 Adela Calderón – Carmen
 
Other Cast
 Luis Alarcón – Mr. Renato Echeñique 
 Maité Fernández – Mrs. Bernarda Leiva
 Jaime Vadell – Priest
 Andrés Velasco – Alberto Salinas 
 Álvaro Morales – Evaristo Pradenas

References

2008 telenovelas
2008 Chilean television series endings
2008 Chilean television series debuts
Chilean telenovelas
Televisión Nacional de Chile telenovelas
Spanish-language telenovelas